Acidiphilium is a genus in the phylum Pseudomonadota (Bacteria).  As the name suggests, this comprises a nutritionally diverse genus of bacteria adapted to life in extremely acidic conditions, and often exhibiting FeIII (ferric iron) reduction.

Etymology
The name Acidiphilium derives from:New Latin noun acidum (from Latin adjective acidus, sour), an acid; New Latin neuter gender adjective philum (from Greek neuter gender adjective philon (φίλον)), friend, loving; New Latin neuter gender noun Acidiphilium (sic), acid lover.

Species
The genus contains 6 species (including basonyms and synonyms), namely
 A. acidophilum ( (Harrison 1983) Hiraishi et al. 1998; New Latin noun acidum (from Latin adjective acidus, sour), an acid; New Latin neuter gender adjective philum (from Greek neuter gender adjective philon (φίλον)), friend, loving; New Latin neuter gender adjective acidophilum, acid loving.), this species used to known as Thiobacillus acidophilus
 A. angustum ( Wichlacz et al. 1986; Latin neuter gender adj, angustum, narrow, small, with respect to nutritional versatility.)
 A. cryptum ( Harrison 1981,  (Type species of the genus).; New Latin neuter gender adjective cryptum (from Greek noun adjective  ), hidden.)
  ( Wakao et al. 1995; Latin adjective multus, many; Latin v. voro, to eat, devour; New Latin neuter gender adjective , devouring many kinds of substances.)
  ( Lobos et al. 1986; New Latin pref. organo- (from Greek adjective , of or pertaining to an organ), pertaining to organic chemical compounds; Latin v. voro, to eat, devour; New Latin neuter gender adjective , devouring organic compounds.)
 A. rubrum ( Wichlacz et al. 1986; Latin adjective ruber -bra -brum, red; Latin neuter gender adjective rubrum, red colored.)Acidocella aminolytica and Acidocella facilis used to be in this genus.

See also
 Bacterial taxonomy
 Microbiology

References 

Bacteria genera
Rhodospirillales